The koru is a spiral shape based on the appearance of a new unfurling silver fern frond. It is an integral symbol in Māori art, carving and tattooing, where it symbolises new life, growth, strength and peace.
Its shape "conveys the idea of perpetual movement," while the inner coil "suggests returning to the point of origin".

Use in design
The koru is the integral motif of the symbolic and seemingly abstract kowhaiwhai designs traditionally used to decorate wharenui (meeting houses). There are numerous semi-formal designs, representing different features of the natural world.

The logo of Air New Zealand, the national carrier, incorporates a koru design—based on the Ngaru (Ngāti Kahungunu) kowhaiwhai pattern—as a symbol of New Zealand flora. The logo was introduced in 1973 to coincide with the arrival of the airline's first McDonnell Douglas DC-10 wide-body jet.

In 1983, Friedensreich Hundertwasser based his proposed design for a secondary New Zealand flag on the symbol. It also formed the basis for a notable series of artworks by Gordon Walters. Koru swirls are also reminiscent of the Tomoe symbol in Japan.

The New Zealand national korfball team is nicknamed The Korus, although the plural for koru is koru.

References

Māori art
Māori words and phrases
Visual motifs
National symbols of New Zealand